Fan Bin (born 30 May 1974) is a retired Chinese Olympic gymnast. He competed at the 1996 Summer Olympics in Atlanta, United States, winning a silver medal in the team competition, and a bronze medal in horizontal bar.

He is also world champion from 1995 World Artistic Gymnastics Championships with the Chinese national team.

References

External links

1974 births
Living people
Chinese male artistic gymnasts
Olympic gymnasts of China
Olympic silver medalists for China
Olympic bronze medalists for China
Gymnasts at the 1996 Summer Olympics
Olympic medalists in gymnastics
Medalists at the 1996 Summer Olympics
Medalists at the World Artistic Gymnastics Championships
People from Pingdingshan
Gymnasts from Henan
20th-century Chinese people